Protein tyrosine kinase 2 beta is an enzyme that in humans is encoded by the PTK2B gene.

Function 

This gene encodes a cytoplasmic protein tyrosine kinase that is involved in calcium-induced regulation of ion channels and activation of the map kinase signaling pathway. The encoded protein may represent an important signaling intermediate between neuropeptide-activated receptors or neurotransmitters that increase calcium flux and the downstream signals that regulate neuronal activity.

The encoded protein undergoes rapid tyrosine phosphorylation and activation in response to increases in the intracellular calcium concentration 
, nicotinic acetylcholine receptor activation, membrane depolarization, or protein kinase C activation. In addition, SOCE-induced Pyk2 activation mediates disassembly of endothelial adherens junctions, via tyrosine (Y1981-residue) phosphorylation of VE-PTP.

This protein has been shown to bind a CRK-associated substrate, a nephrocystin, a GTPase regulator associated with FAK, and the SH2 domain of GRB2.

The encoded protein is a member of the FAK subfamily of protein tyrosine kinases but lacks significant sequence similarity to kinases from other subfamilies. Four transcript variants encoding two different isoforms have been found for this gene.

Interactions 

PTK2B has been shown to interact with:

 BCAR1, 
 Cbl gene, 
 DDEF2, 
 DLG3, 
 DLG4, 
 Ewing sarcoma breakpoint region 1, 
 FYN, 
 GRIN2A, 
 Gelsolin, 
 NPHP1, 
 PITPNM1, 
 PTPN11, 
 PTPN6, 
 Paxillin, 
 RAS p21 protein activator 1, 
 RB1CC1, 
 SORBS2,
 Src,  and
 TGFB1I1, 

VE-PTP

See also 
 Tyrosine kinase

References

Further reading

External links 
 

Tyrosine kinases